Revaz Davitadze (born 16 October 1998) is a Georgian weightlifter.

Career
Davitadze competed at the men's 85 kg event at the 2018 European Weightlifting Championships in Bucharest, Romania, winning a gold medal at the snatch competition (163 kg), a silver medal at the clean and jerk competition (190 kg) and a gold medal for the total score (353 kg). He was the bronze medalist at the 2018 World Championships, and set the Junior World Records in the snatch and clean and jerk.

At the 2021 European Junior & U23 Weightlifting Championships in Rovaniemi, Finland, he won the silver medal in his event.

Major results

References

External links
 

1998 births
Living people
Male weightlifters from Georgia (country)
World Weightlifting Championships medalists
People from Sachkhere
European Weightlifting Championships medalists
21st-century people from Georgia (country)